Senator Hyatt may refer to:

Campbell C. Hyatt (1880–1945), Virginia State Senate
James W. Hyatt (1837–1893), Connecticut State Senate